Claude Richard Henry Kindersley  (11 December 1911 – 31 March 1993) was a British soldier.

Kindersley was the son of Lt-Col Archibald Ogilvie Lyttelton Kindersley CMG, and his wife Edith Mary Kindersley (née Craven).  He was educated at Wellington College and Trinity College, Cambridge.

He was commissioned into the Highland Light Infantry in 1933.  He served with the 2nd Battalion of the HLI at the North-West Frontier, and in Palestine and the Middle East from 1936 to 1943.  He was awarded the Military Cross in 1943.  He continued his career with the 1st Battalion in France and Germany, 1944–45, where he was awarded the DSO.  He commanded the 1st Battalion in 1945.

After the war, he was a Deputy Lieutenant for Hampshire from 1962 to 1974 and for the Isle of Wight from 1974, after the island became a separate county from Hants.  He was the first High Sheriff of the Isle of Wight, 1974–75.

In 1938 he married Vivien Mary, daughter of the late Charles John Wharton Darwin of Elston Hall, Nottinghamshire; they had three daughters.

References 

1911 births
1993 deaths
Companions of the Distinguished Service Order
Recipients of the Military Cross
Deputy Lieutenants of Hampshire
Deputy Lieutenants of the Isle of Wight
High Sheriffs of the Isle of Wight